Sphaeroseius is a genus of mites in the family Laelapidae.

Species
 Sphaeroseius ecitonis (Wasmann, 1901)     
 Sphaeroseius ecitophilus (Mello-Leitão, 1925)

References

Laelapidae